"Strange Days" is a song by the Matthew Good Band. It was released as the third single from the band's third studio album, Beautiful Midnight. The song peaked at #6 on Canada's Rock chart, and is still one of the band's most popular songs.

Music video
The music video for "Strange Days" depicts a young homeless girl begging for change outside an office building, and being turned down by a woman passerby.  Interspersed are "strange" happenings (such as the street turning to dusk) and a flashback sequence showing the girl running away from an abusive father.  Throughout, a disheveled and unshaven Matthew Good is depicted interacting with the video's characters, though his presence goes unnoticed.  At the climax of the song the woman leaves the building, once again dismissing the girl's and a still unnoticed Good's request for change. The young runaway watches as the woman steps off the curb into the path of an oncoming van.  The runaway springs up to save the woman, sacrificing herself in the process.  Fading in, the girl's ghost is shown watching paramedics as they close a body bag over her. She finally acknowledges Good, who is now clean shaven and wearing an all black suit, revealing his role as an angel.  The final blurred shot depicts a little girl skipping down a tunnel toward a bright light and Good follows.

The video reached #1 on the MuchMusic Countdown for two straight weeks between August 25 and September 1, 2000.

Awards and nominations
The video was nominated for Best Video, Best Director and Best Cinematography at the 2000 Much Music Video Awards.

Charts

References

2000 singles
Matthew Good Band songs
Songs written by Matthew Good
Songs written by Dave Genn
1999 songs
Atlantic Records singles